Neil Brown may refer to:

 Neil Brown (Australian politician) (born 1940), Australian lawyer and former Member of the Federal Parliament of Australia and Deputy Leader of the Liberal Party of Australia
 Neil Brown (Canadian politician) (born ), lawyer, biologist, Canadian politician and current Member of the Legislative Assembly of Alberta
 Neil Brown (figure skater) (born 1990), French ice dancer
 Neil Brown (footballer) (1952–2014), Australian rules footballer
 Neil Brown Jr. (born 1980), American actor

See also
 Neal Brown (born 1980), American football coach
 Neal Brown (politician) (1861–1917), lawyer, Wisconsin politician, businessman, and writer
 Neill S. Brown (1810–1886), governor of Tennessee